The Public Seal of Mandatory Palestine was a crown with the words "Palestine High Commissioner" underneath.

See also
 Coat of Arms of Palestine
 Emblem of Israel
 Flag of Mandatory Palestine

British Empire
Mandatory Palestine